Kamano No. 1 Rural LLG is a local-level government (LLG) of Eastern Highlands Province, Papua New Guinea. The Kamano language is spoken in the LLG.

Wards
01. Onampinka
02. Taranofi
03. Iva
04. Omena
05. Ino'onka
06. Bush Kamano

References

Local-level governments of Eastern Highlands Province